The Territory of Orleans or Orleans Territory was an organized incorporated territory of the United States that existed from October 1, 1804, until April 30, 1812, when it was admitted to the Union as the State of Louisiana.

History 
In 1804, all of the Louisiana Purchase south of the 33rd parallel became the Orleans Territory, and the remainder became the District of Louisiana.  (The District of Louisiana was later renamed the Louisiana Territory; and still later, when the Orleans Territory became the State of Louisiana, the Louisiana Territory was renamed the Missouri Territory.)

The Organic Act of 1804, passed on March 26 for October 1 implementation, also created the United States District Court for the District of Orleans—the only time Congress has ever provided a territory with a United States district court equal in its authority and jurisdiction to those of the states.  Congress also established the Superior Court for the Territory of Orleans whose three judges were the top territorial court.

On April 10, 1805, the Territorial Legislature organized 12 counties (starting from the southeast corner moving west and north): Orleans County, LaFourche County, German Coast, Acadia County, Iberville County, Attakapas County, Pointe Coupée County, Opelousas County, Rapides County, Concordia County, Natchitoches County, and Ouachita County.

The area that later became the Florida Parishes on the east side of the Mississippi River was not included in Orleans Territory at this time, as it was in the Spanish territory of West Florida. This area was formally appended to the territory on April 14, 1812, after having been annexed forcibly by the U.S. in 1810, although Spain did not formally relinquish any of West Florida until 1821. The western boundary with Spanish Texas was not fully defined until the Adams–Onís Treaty was negotiated in 1819. A strip of land known as the Sabine Free State just east of the Sabine River served as a neutral ground buffer area from about 1807 until the treaty took effect after ratification in 1821.

The Orleans Territory was the site of the largest slave revolt in American history, the 1811 German Coast Uprising.

In the 1810 United States census, 20 parishes in the Orleans Territory reported the following population counts:

Leaders and representatives
William C. C. Claiborne was appointed Governor of the Orleans Territory; he held this position throughout the territorial period. Later he became the first Governor of the state of Louisiana.

There were two Territorial Secretaries, James Brown (1804–1807) and Thomas B. Robertson (1807–1811). Daniel Clark became the first Territorial Delegate to the U.S. Congress, in December 1806. Judge Dominic Augustin Hall was the U.S. District Judge of the Territory.

Judges of the Superior Court were John Bartow Prevost (1804–1808), Ephraim Kirby (1804) (died en route to New Orleans), Peter Stephen Du Ponceau (1804) (declined President Thomas Jefferson's appointment), William Sprigg (1805–1807), George Mathews, Jr. (1805–1813), Joshua Lewis (1807–1813), and Francois Xavier Martin (1810–1813).

At its first meeting on December 3, 1804, the territory's Legislative Council consisted of Julien de Lallande Poydras, William Kenner, John Watkins, William Wikoff, Benjamin Morgan, Eugene Dorcier, and George Pollock.

See also

Historic regions of the United States
Territorial evolution of the United States
History of Louisiana
List of parishes in Louisiana
Florida Parishes
Spanish West Florida
Orleans Territory's at-large congressional district

Footnotes

Further reading

 Julien Vernet, Strangers on Their Native Soil: Opposition to United States' Governance in Louisiana's Orleans Territory, 1803-1809. Jackson, MS: University Press of Mississippi, 2013.

External links
 The Political Graveyard Secretaries of Orleans Territory

 
Louisiana Purchase
Pre-statehood history of Louisiana
Former organized territories of the United States
States and territories established in 1804
1804 establishments in the Territory of Orleans
States and territories disestablished in 1812
Louisiana Territory
History of New Orleans